Corynellus is a genus of beetles in the family Cerambycidae, containing the following species:

 Corynellus aureus Linsley, 1961
 Corynellus cinnabarinus Chemsak & Linsley, 1979
 Corynellus lampyrimorphus Swift, 2008
 Corynellus mimulus Bates, 1885
 Corynellus ochraceus Bates, 1885

References

Pteroplatini